The International Grains Agreement (IGA) is an international agreement focused on the grain trade which replaced the International Wheat Agreement in 1995, comprises a Grains Trade Convention (GTC) and a Food Aid Convention (FAC).  The IGA is administered by the International Grains Council (IGC), an intergovernmental forum for cooperation on wheat and coarse grain matters.

The Grains Trade Convention provides for information-sharing, analysis and consultations on grain market and policy developments.  Under the Food Aid Convention, donor countries pledge to provide annually specified amounts of food aid to developing countries in the form of grain suitable for human consumption, or cash to buy suitable grains in recipient countries. The International Grains Agreement does not contain any mechanisms for stabilizing supplies, prices, or trade.

References

External links
http://www.igc.org.uk/en/Default.aspx

Food treaties
Agricultural treaties
International Grains Agreement
International Grains Agreement
United Nations treaties
Treaties of Algeria
Treaties of Argentina
Treaties of Australia
Treaties of Canada
Treaties of Ivory Coast
Treaties of Cuba
Treaties of Egypt
Treaties entered into by the European Union
Treaties of the Holy See
Treaties of Hungary
Treaties of India
Treaties of Iran
Treaties of Japan
Treaties of Kazakhstan
Treaties of Kenya
Treaties of Malta
Treaties of Mauritius
Treaties of Morocco
Treaties of Norway
Treaties of Pakistan
Treaties of South Korea
Treaties of Russia
Treaties of Saudi Arabia
Treaties of South Africa
Treaties of Switzerland
Treaties of Tunisia
Treaties of Turkey
Treaties of Ukraine
Treaties of the United States
International Grains Agreement